Family Bible may refer to:

 Family Bible (book), a Bible handed down through a family
 Family Bible (Willie Nelson album), 1980
 "Family Bible" (song), a song written by Willie Nelson
 Family Bible (The Browns album), 1996
 The Family Bible, Ernest Tubb album, 1963